The Church of Our Lady of Remedies is a Roman Catholic cathedral in Luanda, Angola. It was built in 1628 and is the seat of the Roman Catholic Archbishop of Luanda. In 1716 the headquarters of the Diocese of Angola and Congo was transferred from São Salvador of Congo to Luanda, which eventually led the church of Dos Remedios to become cathedral. In 1877 it was in ruins, and restored between 1880 and 1900.  At that time acquired the present appearance, as three doors and curved pediment on the façade. 

In 1949 it was declared a Public Interest, when it was still part of the Portuguese colonial empire.

References

External links
 

Roman Catholic churches in Luanda
Roman Catholic cathedrals in Angola
Catholic Church in Angola
Roman Catholic churches completed in 1628
1628 establishments in the Portuguese Empire
1620s establishments in Africa
17th-century Roman Catholic church buildings in Angola